Andrey Krivosheyev (born 20 October 1970) is a Russian former speed skater. He competed in the men's 5000 metres event at the 1998 Winter Olympics.

References

External links
 

1970 births
Living people
Russian male speed skaters
Olympic speed skaters of Russia
Speed skaters at the 1998 Winter Olympics
People from Salavat
Sportspeople from Bashkortostan